Specker is a surname. Notable people with the surname include:

Ernst Specker (1920–2011), Swiss mathematician
Joe C. Specker (1921–1944), United States Army soldier and Medal of Honor recipient
Alexander Specker (born 1918), Swiss sports shooter

See also
Specker See, lake in Mecklenburg-Vorpommern, Germany
Specker sequence, bounded sequence
Baer–Specker group, Abelian group
Kochen–Specker theorem, quantum mechanics theorem